The women's 1000 meter at the 2013 KNSB Dutch Single Distance Championships took place in Heerenveen at the Thialf ice skating rink on Sunday 11 November 2012. Although this tournament was held in 2012, it was part of the speed skating season 2012–2013.

There were 24 participants.

Title holder was Thijsje Oenema.

Statistics

Result

Draw

Source:

References

Single Distance Championships
2013 Single Distance
World